Gilbert de Singleton (fl. 1300–1307), was an English politician.

He was a Member (MP) of the Parliament of England for Lancashire in 1300, 1302 and 1307.

References

13th-century births
14th-century deaths
English MPs 1300
English MPs 1302
English MPs 1307
Members of the Parliament of England (pre-1707) for Lancashire